Live oak or evergreen oak is any of a number of oaks in several different sections of the genus Quercus that share the characteristic of evergreen foliage. These oaks are not more closely related to each other than they are to other oaks.

The name live oak comes from the fact that evergreen oaks remain green and "live" throughout winter, when other oaks are dormant and leafless. The name is used mainly in North America, where evergreen oaks are widespread in warmer areas along the Atlantic coast from southeast Virginia to Florida, west along the Gulf Coast to Louisiana and Mexico, and across the southwest to California.

Evergreen oak species are also common in parts of southern Europe and south Asia, and are included in this list for the sake of completeness. These species, although not having "live" in their common names in their countries of origin, are colloquially called live oaks when cultivated in North America.

When the term live oak is used in a specific rather than general sense, it most commonly refers to the group of species under Quercus sect. Virentes, which includes the southern live oak (Quercus virginiana), the first species so named, and an icon of the Old South.

According to the Live Oak Society the oldest southern live oak is believed to be the Seven Sisters Oak located in Mandeville, Louisiana with an estimated age of 500–1,000 years.

The southern live oak is the official state tree of Georgia.

A small grove of live oaks on a prairie is known as a mott.

Wood and lumber

Live oak was widely used in early American butt shipbuilding. Because of the trees' short height and low-hanging branches, lumber from live oaks was used in curved parts of the frame, such as knee braces (single-piece, L-shaped braces that spring inward from the side and support the deck), in which the grain runs perpendicular to structural stress, making for exceptional strength.  Live oaks were not generally used for planking because the curved and often convoluted shape of the tree did not lend itself to being milled to planking of any length. Red oak and white oak were generally used for planking on vessels, because those trees grow straight and tall, with straight trunks long enough for planks.

Loggers had cut down most of the live oak trees in southern Europe by the latter half of the 19th century. Live oak timber from the United States was similarly sought and exported until metal-hulled commercial vessels became the norm in the early part of the 20th century.  Live oak lumber is rarely used for furniture, because it warps and twists while drying.

The wood of live oaks continues to be used occasionally in shipbuilding—and in tool handles for its strength, energy absorption, and density, although modern composites are often substituted with good effect.  Dry Southern live oak lumber has a specific gravity of 0.88, among the highest of North American hardwoods.

List of evergreen species in genus Quercus
Section Quercus. The white oaks – Europe, Asia, North Africa, North America, styles short; acorns mature in six months, sweet or slightly bitter, inside of acorn shell is hairless
Quercus arizonica – Arizona white oak – southwestern North America
Quercus fusiformis – (also Quercus virginiana var. fusiformis) Texas live oak – south central North America
Quercus geminata – sand live oak – southeastern North America
Quercus greggii – Gregg oak – Mexico
Quercus hinckleyi – Hinckley oak – Texas
Quercus ilex – Holm oak – southern Europe
Quercus minima – dwarf live oak – southeastern North America
Quercus oblongifolia – Mexican blue oak – southwestern North America
Quercus polymorpha – Mexican white oak or Monterrey oak – Mexico
Quercus pungens – sandpaper oak – south central North America
Quercus rotundifolia − holm oak − southwestern Europe and northwestern Africa
Quercus turbinella – shrub live oak – southwestern North America
Quercus virginiana – southern live oak – southeastern North America
Section Cerris. Europe, Asia, north Africa. Styles long; acorns mature in 18 months, very bitter, inside of acorn shell is hairless or slightly hairy
Quercus calliprinos – Palestine oak – western Asia
Quercus coccifera – Kermes oak – southern Europe
Quercus semecarpifolia – Himalayan oak – eastern Asia
Quercus suber – Cork oak – southwestern Europe
Section Protobalanus – Southwest USA, California coastal ranges and northwest Mexico, styles short, acorns mature in 18 months, very bitter, inside of acorn shell is woolly
Quercus cedrosensis — Cedros Island oak — Baja California
Quercus chrysolepis – canyon live oak – southwestern North America, especially coastal ranges of California
Quercus palmeri – Palmer oak – southwestern North America
Quercus tomentella – Channel Island oak – Channel Islands of California
Quercus vacciniifolia – huckleberry oak – California and southwestern North America
Section Lobatae. The red oaks – North, Central and South America, styles long, acorns mature in 18 months, very bitter, inside of acorn shell is woolly
Quercus agrifolia – coast live and sharpacorn oaks – California and Mexico
Quercus canbyi – Canby oak – Mexico
Quercus emoryi – Emory oak – southwestern North America
Quercus hemisphaerica – laurel oak – southeastern North America
Quercus humboldtii – South American oak – northern South America
Quercus laurifolia – swamp laurel oak – southeastern U.S.
Quercus hypoleucoides – silverleaf oak – southwestern North America
Quercus parvula – Santa Cruz Island and Shreve oaks – California
Quercus rysophylla – loquat leaf oak – Mexico
Quercus wislizeni – interior live oak – California and Mexico

See the list of Quercus species for a fuller listing of oaks, including deciduous species.

References

External links

 Images of remarkable Southern Live Oaks
 The 1000 Year Old "Big Tree" – Goose Island State Park (Texas)
 Live Oak in California
 The William Adkins' Live Oak Tree historical marker

Quercus
L